Ducote is a surname. Notable people with the surname include:

Emily Ducote (born 1994), American mixed martial artist
Moon Ducote (1897–1937), American baseball, football, and basketball coach, football and baseball player, football official, and businessman